Bao Yaxiong (born 23 May 1997) is a Chinese footballer currently playing as a goalkeeper for Hebei China Fortune.

Club career
Bao Yaxiong was promoted to the senior team of Hebei China Fortune within the 2019 Chinese Super League season and would make his debut in a league game on 4 May 2019 against Shandong Luneng Taishan F.C. in a 2-0 defeat.

Career statistics

References

External links

1997 births
Living people
Sportspeople from Hangzhou
Chinese footballers
Association football goalkeepers
Chinese Super League players
Hebei F.C. players
21st-century Chinese people